The 4th Armoured Division is an elite formation of the Syrian Army whose primary purpose is to defend the Syrian government from internal and external threats.

History
The division has its roots in the Defense Companies commanded by Rifaat al-Assad, younger brother of President Hafez al-Assad. After Rifaat was banished from Syria in 1984, the Defense Companies were reorganised into the 569th Armoured Division, and later into the 4th Armoured Division.

The Division is regarded by some as the best trained and best equipped of the Syrian Army. The 4th Armoured Division, the Republican Guard, and Syria's secret police form the heart of the country's security forces. As a result, the Division is drawn mostly from members of the same Alawite group as the Assad family. About 80 percent of the division's soldiers and officers are Alawites and nearly 90 percent of them are career soldiers, in contrast to the conscripts who comprise most of the army's other units.

Its main entrance gate is located next to the village of Al-Horjelah.

Syrian civil war

During the uprising phase of the Syrian civil war, the 4th Armoured Division played a key role in attempting to put down uprisings, being sent to quell protests in the southern city of Daraa, the coastal city of Baniyas, the central province of Homs and the northern province of Idlib. Alawite officers from the 4th Armoured Division have been sent to other formations within the Syrian army in an attempt by the government to keep a closer eye and firmer grip on many Sunni dominated formations, with the officers sent from the division relying on the division's fearsome reputation to keep soldiers in line.

Both the division as a whole and its component parts have been accused of engaging in human rights abuses during the Syrian uprising, such as arbitrary arrests and beatings, and the shooting of unarmed protesters. Their use by the Syrian regime in the uprising has led to many of the division's commanders being subject to EU sanctions and travel bans.

A July 2013 report by a pro-government websites stated that Maher al-Assad had been commanding troops in the Aleppo and Homs theatre of operations.

Later on, there were reports of their control over international border crossings, such as Nasib Border Crossing and other illegal border crossings between Lebanon and Syria, which are used as financial sources to cover their expenses.

Battle order 

 40th Armored Brigade
 41st Armored Brigade
 42nd Armored Brigade
 138th Mechanized Brigade
 154th Artillery Regiment
 63rd Artillery Regiment
 555th Special Forces Regiment (Airborne) 
 Protective Lions (Commandos), formed in May 2014.
 National Shield
 Harakat Hezbollah al-Nujaba Syrian-wing

References 

Armoured divisions of Syria
Protective security units
1984 establishments in Syria
Military units and formations established in 1984